Anai Mogini (born 1 March 2003) is a Bangladeshi women's football defender who plays as a right-back for Bashundhara Kings Women. She currently plays at the Bangladesh women's national under-17 football team. She was a member of the AFC U-14 Girls' Regional Championship – South and Central winning team in 2016 in Tajikistan. She scored a goal in that tournament. She is the older twin sister of Anuching Mogini, who also plays football.

Early years
Anai Mogini was born in 2003 in Khagrachhari district. Her father, Ripru Magh, is a farmer. He sells traditional herbal medicine. Her mother's name is Apruma Mogini. She studied at Ghagra Bohumukhi High School in Rangamati district.

Playing career
Mogini started playing football in 2011.

National
She played in the Bangamata Sheikh Fazilatunnesa Mujib Gold Cup Football Tournament for Mogachori Primary School, Rangamati. This is an annual national youth football for girls. The team became the champion in 2012. She represented Rangamati in the KFC national women's championship in 2014 as her home district, Khagrachhari, was not taking part in the competition.

Anai Mogini now plays for her school, Ghagra Bohumukhi High School. She helped her team to become runners-up in Bangamata Sheikh Fazilatunnesa Mujib Gold Cup Football Tournament in 2013, 2014, and 2015.

International
Anai Mogini was selected to the Bangladesh women's U-17 team for the 2017 AFC U-16 Women's Championship qualification – Group C matches. She played for the first time at the tournament in the match against Kyrgyzstan women's U-17 on 31 August 2016. Being group C champion, Bangladesh have qualified for the 2017 AFC U-16 Women's Championship in Thailand in September 2017.

Honours
 AFC U-14 Girls' Regional C'ship – South and Central
 Bangladesh U-14 Girls'
 Champion: 2016

References

External links
 "Anuching, Anai to become the first twins to represent Bangladesh women's football" in Daily Star, 26 April 2016
 মগিনি বোনদের দুরন্ত ছুটে চলা  on Bangla Tribune, 1 September 2016

2003 births
Living people
Bangladeshi women's footballers
Bangladesh Women's Football League players
Women's association football defenders
People from Khagrachhari District
Marma people
Bangladeshi Buddhists
Bangladeshi women's futsal players
South Asian Games bronze medalists for Bangladesh
South Asian Games medalists in football